Lucy Beaumont may refer to:

Lucy Beaumont (actress) (1869–1937), English actress
Lucy Beaumont (comedian) (born 1983), English stand-up comedian